Robert Bruce Van Valkenburgh (September 4, 1821 – August 1, 1888) was a United States representative from New York, officer in the Union Army during the American Civil War, and subsequent US Minister Resident to Japan.

Biography
Born in Prattsburgh, Steuben County, New York, he attended Franklin Academy there. He studied law, was admitted to the bar, and commenced practice in Bath. He was a member of the New York State Assembly (Steuben Co., 1st D.) in 1852, 1857 and 1858. In 1858, he was the Republican candidate for Speaker, but was defeated by Democrat Thomas G. Alvord on the 53rd ballot.

Van Valkenburgh was in command of the recruiting depot in Elmira and organized seventeen regiments early in the Civil War. He was elected as a Republican to the 37th and 38th United States Congresses, holding office from March 4, 1861, to March 3, 1865. While in the House he was Chairman of the Committee on Militia (37th and 38th Congresses). He served as colonel of the 107th New York Volunteer Infantry, and was its commander at the Battle of Antietam.

Following the war, he was Acting Commissioner of Indian Affairs in 1865. He was appointed Minister Resident to Japan on January 18, 1866, and remained on the post until November 11, 1869. It was in his role as Minister Resident in Japan that Van Valkenburgh prevented the delivery of the CSS Stonewall to the forces of the Tokugawa clan during the Boshin War.

After his return from Japan, Van Valkenburgh settled in Florida, and was appointed associate justice of the Florida Supreme Court on May 20, 1874. He remained on the bench until his death in Suwannee Springs, near Live Oak in 1888. He was buried at the Old St. Nicholas Cemetery, on the south side of the St. Johns River, in Jacksonville.

References

External links

1821 births
1888 deaths
American people of Dutch descent
People from Prattsburgh, New York
Republican Party members of the New York State Assembly
Union Army colonels
Ambassadors of the United States to Japan
Justices of the Florida Supreme Court
People of New York (state) in the American Civil War
People of the Boshin War
Republican Party members of the United States House of Representatives from New York (state)
19th-century American politicians
19th-century American judges
19th-century American diplomats